The Masters Review is an American literary magazine and book publisher based in Portland, Oregon. Established in 2011 by founding editor Kim Winternheimer, the publication serves a platform for publishing and discovering new and emerging writers. Since its inception, The Masters Review has been honored by the Independent Publisher Book Awards for Best Short Story Collection by the American Library Association and Foreword Reviews, a fellowship from Oregon Literary Arts for the work it does for new writers, and has stories recognized in The Best of the Net, The Best Small Fictions, and The Million Writers Award, among others. It is distinguished from many other notable literary magazines by actively seeking work from previously unpublished writers.

Working with authors Lauren Groff, A. M. Homes, Lev Grossman, Kevin Brockmeier, Amy Hempel, and Roxane Gay, The Masters Review produces a printed volume of ten stories annually, which showcases and promotes emerging writers. It also publishes fiction and narrative nonfiction by new writers online, as well as stories and essays from guest writers including: Kate Bernheimer, Ben Loory, Manuel Gonzales, Julia Elliot, and Ottessa Moshfegh, to name a few.

The publication hosts several contests year round, including its notable Short Story Award for New Writers, which is held twice yearly and awards cash prizes, publication, and connects writers with literary agencies looking for new talent.

The Masters Review (Online) 
The Masters Review publishes a great deal of its content online. Fiction, essays, interviews with important literary figures, craft essays, submission opportunities to other literary magazines and publications, book reviews by debut authors, and literary and cultural criticism are consistent features.

A Platform For Emerging Writers 
The Masters Review focuses exclusively on emerging writers, which the publication defines as any writer who has not published a novel at the time of submission. They are open to writers with published story collections and writers with novels that were self-published or saw a circulation below 3000 copies, as showcased in Portland Monthly. The Masters Review accepts submissions and essays from writers around the world as long as stories are written and submitted in English.

Annual Anthology
The Masters Review printed anthology serves as a major endorsement for new writers. Printed annually, a guest judge contributes an introduction and selects ten writers from a shortlist to be published in the collection. Aside from national distribution and high visibility in the printed work, the anthology is also part of an exclusive mailing to agents, with the aim of connecting new writers with representation. The Masters Review Volume III with stories selected by Lev Grossman received an INDIEFAB medal for Best Short Story Collection.

Writers who selected work for The Masters Review Annual Anthology

 Lauren Groff, The Masters Review Vol. I (2012)
 A. M. Holmes, The Masters Review Vol. II (2013)
 Lev Grossman, The Masters Review Vol. III (2014)
 Kevin Brockmeier, The Masters Review Vol. IV (2015)
 Amy Hempel, The Masters Review Vol. V (2016)
 Roxane Gay, The Masters Review Vol. VI (2017)
 Rebecca Makkai, The Masters Review Vol. VII (2018)
 Kate Bernheimer, The Masters Review Vol. VIII (2019)
 Rick Bass, The Masters Review Vol. IX (2020)

New Voices
New Voices appear online throughout the year. This category invites emerging writers to submit fiction and narrative nonfiction, selected by The Masters Review staff. New Voices stories include winners and finalists in The Best Small Fictions, The Best of The Net, and Million Writers Award, to name a few.

Writers whose work has appeared in The Masters Review New Voices

A full list of authors can be found at

Featured Fiction
The Masters Review provides Featured Fiction, or stories written by established guest writers to appear online throughout the year. In this way, the publication aligns their new writers with established talent while offering free access to quality fiction and narrative nonfiction to its readership.

Writers who contributed work for The Masters Review Featured Fiction

 Manuel Gonzales, What Happened to Eloise, (2014)
 Ben Hoffman, Other Dangers, (2014)
 Kate Bernheimer, The Punk's Bride (2015)
 Ben Loory, The Candelabra (2015)
 JM Tyree and Michael McGriff, Our Secret Life in The Movies (reprint, 2015)
 Kelly Luce, Lookout (2015)
 Adrian Van Young, The Lady Winchester Deciphers Her Labyrinth (2015)
 Julia Elliott, The Restorative Unit (2015)
 Katie Chase, Creation Story (2016)
 Thomas Pierce, A Rogue Planet (2016)
 Brian Evenson, Room Tone (2016)
 Lydia Davis, The Visitor (2017)
 Jac Jemc, Hunt and Catch (2017)
 Ron Rash, Last Bridge Burned (2018)
 Chaya Bhuvaneswar, Heitor (2018)
 Kathy Fish, Praise Rain (2019)
 Adrian Van Young, Under the System (2019)
 Sherrie Flick, Woodpeckers Peck to Establish Territory in the Spring (2020)

Staff

 Kim Winternheimer: Founder
 Cole Meyer: Editorial Director
 Melissa Hinshaw: Assistant Editor
 Brandon Williams: Assistant Editor
 Melissa Bean: Reader  
 Abby Burns: Reader  
 Jennifer Dupree: Reader  
 Elena Ender: Reader   
 Ross Feeler: Reader 
 Kimberly Guerin: Reader  
 Lauren Harkawik: Reader  
 Courtney Harler: Reader  
 Tom Houseman: Reader  
 Benjamin Kessler: Reader   
 Mariya Khan: Reader   
 Abbie Lahmers: Reader   
 Meghan Lane: Reader  
 Melissa Madore: Reader  
 Emily McLaughlin: Reader  
 Aurore Munyabera: Reader  
 Kathryn Ordiway: Reader  
 Halley Parry: Reader  
 Ben Perkins: Reader  
 Fiona Robertson: Reader  
 Michelle Servellon: Reader  
 Nicole VanderLinden: Reader  
 Hannah VanDuinen: Reader  
 Kelsey Wang: Reader  
 Rebecca Williamson: Reader

Books published

 The Masters Review Volume I with stories selected by Lauren Groff (2012). 
 The Masters Review Volume II with stories selected by AM Homes (2013). 
 The Masters Review Volume III with stories selected by Lev Grossman (2014). 
 The Masters Review Volume IV with stories selected by Kevin Brockmeier (2015). 
 The Masters Review Volume V with stories selected by Amy Hempel (2016). 
 The Masters Review Volume VI with stories selected by Roxane Gay (2017). 
 The Masters Review Volume VII with stories selected by Rebecca Makkai (2018). 
 The Masters Review Volume VIII with stories selected by Kate Bernheimer (2019). 
 The Masters Review Volume IX with stories selected by Rick Bass (2020).

See also
List of literary magazines

References

External links
 The Masters Review (official website)

2011 establishments in Oregon
Literary magazines published in the United States
Magazines established in 2011
Magazines published in Portland, Oregon
Short story awards